Jenny of the Prairie is a video game developed by Rhiannon Software for the Apple II in 1983 and later published by Addison-Wesley for the Commodore 64 and DOS. It was one of the first games featuring female character as the protagonist. It was the first personal computer gaming programs specifically targeted for young girls.

Gameplay 
Jenny was left behind by her family, lost in the prairie. The player needs to keep her safe, fed and watered as she prepares herself for the coming winter. She can chop wood for a fire, pick flowers, pick wheat, and hunt rabbits for food and for fur to keep warm. She may also attempt to tame a fox. She needs to avoid the mountain lion and rattlesnake; if they get to Jenny, it is game over.

References 

1983 video games
Addison-Wesley books
Apple II games
Commodore 64 games
Single-player video games
Survival video games
Video games developed in the United States
Video games featuring female protagonists